The following are country calling codes in Africa.

States and territories with country calling codes
 west Africa

States and territories without a country calling code

See also
Telephone numbering plan
List of country calling codes
List of international call prefixes
:Category:Telephone numbers by country

References

Communications in Africa
International telecommunications
Telephone numbers
Telecommunications in Africa